The Girls' 50 metre breaststroke event at the 2010 Youth Olympic Games took place on August 15–16, at the Singapore Sports School.

Medalists

Heats

Heat 1

Heat 2

Heat 3

Heat 4

Semifinal

Heat 1

Heat 2

Final

References
 Heat Results
 Semifinals Results
 Final Result

Swimming at the 2010 Summer Youth Olympics